Joey Sim Wei Zhi (born 2 March 1987) is a former Singaporean footballer who last played as a goalkeeper for Tanjong Pagar United.

International career
Sim made his international debut coming on as a substitute for Singapore in a friendly match against Pakistan on 19 November 2012.

Honours

International
Singapore
AFF Championship: 2012

References 

Living people
1987 births
Singaporean footballers
Singapore international footballers
Singaporean sportspeople of Chinese descent
Home United FC players
Hougang United FC players
Balestier Khalsa FC players
Singapore Premier League players
Association football goalkeepers